Preston Popp (born December 8, 1999) is a Canadian soccer player who plays for North Carolina FC in USL League One.

Early life
Born in Montreal, Popp is the son of Jim Popp, who was the general manager of the Canadian Football League team Montreal Allouettes at the time. He began playing youth soccer with CS Dollard, before moving to Mooresville, North Carolina at age ten. He played youth soccer with the Charlotte Soccer Academy and North Carolina FC. He then played with the New York Red Bulls Academy and the Toronto FC Academy.

College career
In 2018, he began attending the University of North Carolina at Charlotte, where he played for the men's soccer team. He scored his first goal on September 11, 2018 against the Elon Phoenix. In his freshman season, he was named to the Conference USA All-Freshman Team and the Conference USA All-Tournament Team. In his junior season, he was the Co-Golden Boot winner and was named to the Conference USA Second Team, and was also a Second Team Scholar All-American, United Soccer Coaches All-Southeast Region, and Scholar All-Region. He was also named to the College Sports Information Directors of America All-District III First Team. In his senior season in 2021, he once again won the Conference USA Golden Boot, All-Region honours, and was named to the Conference USA First Team.

Club career
In 2019, he played with North Carolina FC U23 in USL League Two, despite originally being set to join Reading United AC. He was named to the USL2 Team of the Week, after scoring his first goal on June 7 against Lionsbridge FC, scoring in stoppage time to give his team a 2-1 victory.

After not being selected in the 2022 MLS SuperDraft, he signed a contract with MLS Next Pro side Rochester New York FC. On May 1, he joined FC Cincinnati II on a short-term loan for their match against Toronto FC II, as Cincinnati was experiencing a roster shortage. In November 2022, Rochester announced Popp would be departing the club.

In December 2022, Popp signed a professional contract with USL League One club North Carolina FC for the 2023 season, re-joining his former youth club.

References

External links

1999 births
Living people
Anglophone Quebec people
Canadian soccer players
Canadian people of American descent
Association football forwards
Toronto FC players
Rochester New York FC players
Soccer players from Montreal
MLS Next Pro players
North Carolina FC U23 players
USL League Two players
New York Red Bulls players
Charlotte 49ers men's soccer players
North Carolina FC players